Year 388 (CCCLXXXVIII) was a leap year starting on Saturday (link will display the full calendar) of the Julian calendar. At the time, it was known as the Year of the Consulship of Augustus without colleague (or, less frequently, year 1141 Ab urbe condita). The denomination 388 for this year has been used since the early medieval period, when the Anno Domini calendar era became the prevalent method in Europe for naming years.

Events 
 By place 
 Roman Empire 
 Battle of the Save: Emperor Theodosius I defeats Magnus Maximus near Emona (modern Slovenia). Theodosius is in command of an army including Goths, Huns and Alans. Valentinian II, now 17, is restored as Roman Emperor.
 August 28 – Magnus Maximus surrenders at Aquileia, and is executed. Theodosius I devotes himself to gluttony and voluptuous living. Maximus' son Flavius Victor is executed at Trier, by Valentinian's magister militum Arbogast. 

 Persia 
 King Shapur III dies after a reign in which he has partitioned Armenia with the Roman Empire. He is succeeded by his son Bahram IV, who becomes the twelfth Sassanid king of Persia.

 India 
 Emperor Chandragupta II, ruler of the Gupta Empire, begins a war against the Shaka Dynasty in West India.

 By topic 
 Religion 
 Paternus becomes bishop of the Episcopal see of Braga (Portugal).
 Isaac, age 50, is named Catholicos (spiritual head) of the Armenian Apostolic Church.
 Jerome moves to Palestine, where he spends the rest of his life as a hermit near Bethlehem.
 A group of Christians storms the synagogue of the city Callinicum (Syria), at the Euphrates.

Births 
 Elpidius of Atella (or Elpidio), Christian bishop (d. 452)
 Yao Hong, Chinese emperor of the Qiang state (d. 417)

Deaths 
 August 28 – Magnus Maximus, Roman emperor
 Flavius Victor, Roman co-emperor (Augustus)
 Huan Shiqian (or Zhen'e), Chinese general 
 Maternus Cynegius, Roman praetorian prefect
 Qifu Guoren, Chinese ruler of the Xianbei state
 Shapur III, king of the Sassanid Empire (Persia)
 Themistius, Byzantine statesman and rhetorician 
 Xie Xuan (or Youdu), Chinese general (b. 343)

References